is a Japanese retired figure skater. He was named in Japan's team to the 2015 World Junior Championships in Tallinn, Estonia. Sato ranked 17th in the short program, 14th in the free skate, and 15th overall. He has won three senior international medals.

Programs

Competitive highlights 

GP: Grand Prix; CS: Challenger Series; JGP: Junior Grand Prix

References

External links 

 

1995 births
Japanese male single skaters
Living people
People from Morioka, Iwate
Sportspeople from Iwate Prefecture
Competitors at the 2019 Winter Universiade